Courtney Brown (born 1952) is an American political scientist and parapsychologist who is an associate professor in the political science department at Emory University. He is known for promoting the use of nonlinear mathematics in social scientific research, and as a proponent of remote viewing, a form of extrasensory perception. 

He is the founder of the Farsight Institute which does explorations into the past or future through remote viewings along with exposing secret information.

Applied mathematics
Brown's research in applied mathematics is mostly focused on social science applications of time-dependent models. He has published five peer-reviewed books and numerous articles on the subject of applied mathematics. Brown is also a very visible advocate of the use of the R Programming Language, both for statistical as well as nonlinear modeling applications in the social sciences.

Remote viewing

Brown learned the basic Transcendental Meditation and an advanced technique called the TM-Sidhi program in 1991. He claims to have engaged in "yogic flying" at the Golden Dome of Pure Knowledge at Maharishi University of Management in Fairfield, Iowa in 1992.

Brown's remote viewing findings have been dismissed by scientists, such as his colleague at Emory University Scott O. Lilienfeld, who has stated that Brown has refused to subject his ideas and his claimed psychic powers to independent scientific testing on what Lilienfeld describes as "curious" grounds.

Among a variety of controversial topics, Brown has claimed to apply remote viewing to the study of multiple realities, the nonlinearity of time, planetary phenomena, extraterrestrial life, UFOs, Atlantis, and even Jesus Christ. According to Michael Shermer "The claims in Brown's two books are nothing short of spectacularly weird. Through his numerous SRV sessions he says he has spoken with Jesus and Buddha (both, apparently, are advanced aliens), visited other inhabited planets, time traveled to Mars back when it was fully inhabited by intelligent ETs, and has even determined that aliens are living among us—one group in particular resides underground in New Mexico."

Martin Gardner wrote about Brown's book "Cosmic Voyage" about his remote viewing findings of extraterrestrials, "The only earlier book about UFOs I can think of that is nuttier than this one is George Adamski's 'Inside the Space Ships' (1955)."

Robert Baker writing in the Skeptical Inquirer came to the conclusion that Brown's beliefs from remote viewing about alien civilizations is a case of self-deception.

Publications
Cosmic Voyage: A Scientific Discovery of Extraterrestrials Visiting Earth (1996)
Cosmic Explorers: Scientific Remote Viewing, Extraterrestrials, and a Message for Mankind (1999)
Remote Viewing: The Science and Theory of Nonphysical Perception (2005)
Politics in Music: Music and Political Transformation From Beethoven to Hip-Hop (2007)
Ballots of Tumult: A Portrait of Volatility in American Voting (1991)
Serpents in the Sand: Essays on the Nonlinear Nature of Politics and Human Destiny (2007)

References

External links
 
 Courtney Brown profile at Emory University
 CIA Stargate Collection Official military documents, regarding results and experiments on remote viewing.
 

1952 births
Living people
Place of birth missing (living people)
American parapsychologists
American political scientists
Emory University faculty
Remote viewers